Muratçayırı can refer to:

 Muratçayırı, Çat
 Muratçayırı, Refahiye